Torchesk was a medieval town, located between today's villages of Olshanytsia and Sharky in Kyiv Oblast (province) of central Ukraine near Kaharlyk.

Torchesk was first mentioned in a chronicle under the year of 1093 as the center of the Torks (and later Chorni Klobuky), who settled along the Ros River valley and served Kievan princes. In the second half of the 12th century, Torchesk became the capital of a principality, with its rulers being appointed by the grand princes of Kiev.

Torchesk was last mentioned in a chronicle in 1234. It appears that the town was destroyed by the Mongol invasions.

Former cities in Ukraine
History of Kyiv Oblast
Kievan Rus'